Yevhen Viktorovych Shmakov (born 7 June 1985) is a former professional Ukrainian football midfielder.

Career
He played for Arsenal Kyiv in the Ukrainian Premier League on loan from Dynamo Kyiv. On 22 August 2008, Arsenal Kyiv broke their contract with Shmakov, and was granted a free-agent status by Dynamo Kyiv, which he used to sign for Tavriya Simferopol where he played for one season before moving to Illichevets Mariupol.

References

External links
Profile on FootballSquads

1985 births
Living people
Ukrainian footballers
Association football midfielders
Ukrainian expatriate footballers
Expatriate footballers in Russia
Expatriate footballers in Belarus
Expatriate footballers in Azerbaijan
Expatriate footballers in Kazakhstan
FC Karpaty Lviv players
FC Karpaty-2 Lviv players
FC Karpaty-3 Lviv players
FC Dynamo Kyiv players
FC Zorya Luhansk players
FC Arsenal Kyiv players
SC Tavriya Simferopol players
FC Mariupol players
FC Luch Vladivostok players
FC Gomel players
Simurq PIK players
FC Kaisar players
Sportspeople from Khmelnytskyi, Ukraine